Chilo terrenellus, the sugarcane borer, is a species of moth of the family Crambidae. It was described by Arnold Pagenstecher in 1900 and is found in Papua New Guinea and islands in the Torres Strait.

The larvae feed on sugarcane. They tunnel into the stalks of their host plant. This may result in dead tops, broken stalks and reduced sugar content, as well as poor-quality canes. The tunnels also provide access for other pests and pathogens.

References

Chiloini
Moths described in 1900